"Green Fields" is a 2007 song by The Good, the Bad & the Queen.

Green Fields or Greenfields may also refer to:

Places
 Green fields, Ooty, Tamil Nadu, India
 Green Fields, South Australia, a northern suburb of Adelaide
 Greenfields railway station
 Greenfields, Western Australia, a suburb of Mandurah, south of the City of Perth

Music
 Green Fields, a 1981 album by The Watersons
 Greenfields (album), a 2021 album by Barry Gibb
 "Green Fields", a song recorded by The Brothers Four in 1960
 "Green Fields" (Union Trade Song)

Other uses
 Green Fields (film), a 1937 film directed by Jacob Ben-Ami and Edgar G. Ulmer
 Green Fields School, in Tucson, Arizona
 Greenfields (Cecilton, Maryland), a historic home
 Greenfields (dairy company), an Indonesian dairy company

See also
 
 Greenfield (disambiguation)